Francis Warren Rockwell (July 2, 1886 – January 2, 1979) was a vice admiral in the United States Navy who served from 1908 to 1948.

Early life and career
Rockwell was born in South Woodstock, Connecticut.  He entered the Naval Academy in 1904, graduated in 1908, and was commissioned as an ensign on June 6, 1910.  After various assignments before and after his commissioning, he directed the fitting out of the destroyer  in 1912-1914.  In 1914 he joined the faculty of the Naval Academy as an instructor in electrical engineering and physics, serving there until 1917 when the United States entered World War I.

World War I and interwar years
Rockwell served aboard the battleship  and aboard various destroyers in Queenstown, Ireland, during the war. He commanded  in 1918 and then the new destroyer  in 1919. In 1920 he returned as an instructor at the Naval Academy, serving there until 1923. After a stint in the Department of the Navy in Washington, D.C., he commanded   from 1939 to 1941.

World War II
On November 5, 1941, Rockwell assumed command of the 16th Naval District, consisting of the Philippine Islands.  He was present in Cavite Navy Yard when it was bombed on December 10, 1941.  Most of Cavite's facilities were destroyed and the submarine  was sunk.  Rockwell estimated that 500 men were killed. The next day, with fires still burning, he recommended Cavite be stripped of usable fuel and equipment and abandoned.  He organized the withdrawal of remaining Allied naval forces and civilian ships from the Philippines and left in March 1942 via PT boat.  Then, he planned the naval transport of the invasion force for the Battle of Attu of May 1943.  He returned to the Navy Department in 1943 and commanded the Atlantic Fleet's Amphibious Training Command until the end of the war.

Retirement
Rockwell retired as vice admiral in August 1948. He lived in Georgia until his death in 1979.

Rockwell's wife Mary Allison (Wilmer) Rockwell (April 12, 1887 – July 30, 1971) predeceased him and was buried at Arlington National Cemetery. He was interred beside her on January 5, 1979.

Awards and merits
Silver Star, Awarded for actions during World War II

Navy Distinguished Service Medal, Awarded for actions during World War II

Navy Cross, Awarded for actions during World War I

See also

 Philippines campaign (1941–1942)
 Battle of Attu
 United States Navy

References

External links
Francis W. Rockwell Papers, 1910-1980 (bulk 1910-1966) MS 419 held by Special Collections & Archives, Nimitz Library at the United States Naval Academy

1886 births
1979 deaths
People from Woodstock, Connecticut
United States Naval Academy alumni
United States Navy personnel of World War I
Recipients of the Navy Cross (United States)
United States Navy World War II admirals
Recipients of the Silver Star
Recipients of the Navy Distinguished Service Medal
United States Navy vice admirals
Burials at Arlington National Cemetery